Škoda Auto a.s., often shortened to Škoda, is a Czech automobile manufacturer established in 1925 as the successor to Laurin & Klement and headquartered in Mladá Boleslav, Czech Republic. Škoda Works became state owned in 1948. After 1991, it was gradually privatized to the German Volkswagen Group, becoming a partial subsidiary in 1994 and a wholly owned subsidiary in 2000.

Škoda automobiles are sold in over 100 countries, and in 2018, total global sales reached 1.25 million units, an increase of 4.4% from the previous year. The operating profit was €1.6 billion in 2017, an increase of 34.6% over the previous year. As of 2017, Škoda's profit margin was the second-highest of all Volkswagen AG brands after Porsche.

History
The Škoda Works was established as an arms manufacturer in 1859. It was one of the largest European industrial conglomerates of the 20th century, founded by Czech engineer Emil Škoda in 1859 in Plzeň, then in the Kingdom of Bohemia, Austrian Empire. It is the predecessor of today's Škoda Auto, Doosan Škoda Power and Škoda Transportation companies. 

Škoda Auto (and its predecessor Laurin & Klement) is the fifth-oldest company producing cars, and has an unbroken history alongside Daimler, Opel, Peugeot, and Tatra.

Laurin & Klement

As with many long-established car manufacturers, the company that became Škoda Auto started in the early 1890s by manufacturing bicycles. Škoda (then Laurin & Klement) factories were founded in 1896 as a velocipede manufacturer.

In , 26-year-old Václav Klement (1868–1938), who was a bookseller in Mladá Boleslav, Kingdom of Bohemia (today's Czech Republic, then part of Austria-Hungary), was unable to obtain spare parts to repair his German bicycle. Klement returned his bicycle to the manufacturers, Seidel and Naumann, with a letter, in Czech, asking them to carry out repairs, only to receive a reply, in German, stating: "If you want us to answer you, we insist that you convey your message in a language we understand." Not satisfied with the reply and realising the business potential, Klement, despite having no technical experience, decided to start a bicycle repair shop, which Václav Laurin and he opened in 1896 in Mladá Boleslav. Before going into partnership with Klement, Laurin was an established bicycle manufacturer in the nearby town of Turnov.

In 1898, after moving to their newly built factory, the pair bought a Werner "Motocyclette". Laurin & Klement's first motorcyclette, powered by an engine mounted on the handlebars driving the front wheels, proved dangerous and unreliable – an early accident on it cost Laurin a front tooth. To design a safer machine with its structure around the engine, the pair wrote to German ignition specialist Robert Bosch for advice on a different electromagnetic system.

Their new Slavia motorcycle made its debut in 1899, and the company became the first motorcycle factory in Central Europe. In 1900, with a company workforce of 32, Slavia exports began and 150 machines were shipped to London for the Hewtson firm. Shortly afterwards, the press credited them as makers of the first motorcycle.

By 1905, the firm was manufacturing automobiles, making it the second-oldest car manufacturer in the Czech lands after Tatra. The first model, Voiturette A, was a success, and the company was established both within Austria-Hungary and internationally.

Škoda

After World War I, the Laurin & Klement company began producing trucks, but in 1924, after running into problems and being affected by a fire on their premises, the company sought a new partner.

Meanwhile, Akciová společnost, dříve Škodovy závody (Limited Company, formerly the Škoda Works), an arms manufacturer and multisector concern in Plzeň, which had become one of the largest industrial enterprises in Europe and the largest in Czechoslovakia, sought to enlarge its nonarms-manufacturing base, so acquired Laurin & Klement in 1925. It also started manufacturing cars in cooperation with Hispano-Suiza. Most of the later production took place under Škoda's name.

An assembly line was used for production from 1930 onwards. In the same year, a formal spin-off of the car manufacture into a new company, Akciová společnost pro automobilový průmysl or abbreviated ASAP, took place. ASAP remained a wholly owned subsidiary of the Škoda Works, and continued to sell cars under the Škoda marque. Apart from the factory in Mladá Boleslav, it included also the firm's representation, sales offices, and services, as well as a central workshop in Prague. At the time, the car factory in Mladá Boleslav covered an area of 215,000 m2 and employed 3,750 blue-collar and 500 white-collar workers.

After a decline caused by the economic depression, Škoda introduced a new line of cars in the 1930s, which significantly differed from its previous products. A new design of chassis with backbone tube and all-around independent suspension was developed under the leadership of chief engineer Vladimír Matouš and modelled on the one first introduced by Hans Ledwinka in Tatra. First used on model Škoda 420 Standard in 1933, it aimed at solving insufficient torsional stiffness of the ladder frame.

The new design of chassis became the basis for models Popular (845–1,089 cc), Rapid (1,165–1,766 cc), Favorit (1,802–2,091 cc), and  Superb (2,492–3,991 cc). While in 1933 Škoda had a 14% share of the Czechoslovak car market and occupied third place behind Praga and Tatra, the new line made it a market leader by 1936, with a 39% share in 1938.

World War II
During the occupation of Czechoslovakia in World War II, the Škoda Works were turned into part of the Reichswerke Hermann Göring serving the Nazi German war effort by producing components for military terrain vehicles, military planes, other weapons components and cartridge cases. Vehicle output decreased from 7,052 in 1939 to 683 in 1944, of which only 35 were passenger cars. Between January and May 1945, 316 trucks were produced. The UK and US air forces bombed the Škoda works repeatedly between 1940 and 1945. The final massive air raid took place on 25 April 1945, and resulted in the almost complete destruction of the Škoda armament works and about 1,000 dead or injured.

Post World War II

When, by July 1945, the Mladá Boleslav factory had been reconstructed, production of Škoda's first post-World War II car, the 1101 series, began. It was essentially an updated version of the pre-World War II Škoda Popular. In the autumn of 1948, Škoda (along with all other large manufacturers) became part of the communist planned economy, which meant it was separated from the parent company, Škoda Works. In spite of unfavourable political conditions and losing contact with technical development in noncommunist countries, Škoda retained a good reputation until the 1960s, producing models such as the Škoda 440 Spartak, 445 Octavia, Felicia, and Škoda 1000 MB.

In late 1959, the Škoda Felicia, a compact four-cylinder convertible coupe, was imported into the United States for model year 1960. Its retail price was around US$2,700, for which one could purchase a V8 domestic car that was larger, more comfortable, and had more luxury and convenience features (gasoline retailed for less than 30 cents per US gallon, so fuel economy was not of primary importance in the United States at that time). Those Felicias that made it to American ownership soon had a number of reliability problems, further damaging the car's reputation. The Felicia was, therefore, a poor seller in the U.S., and leftover cars ended up being hied off at a fraction of the original retail list. Since that time, Škoda automobiles have not been imported into the U.S. for retail sale.

In the late 1980s, Škoda (then named Automobilové závody, národní podnik or abbreviated AZNP) was still manufacturing cars that conceptually dated back to the 1960s. Rear-engined models such as the Škoda 105/120 (Estelle) and Rapid sold steadily and performed well against more modern makes in races such as the RAC Rally in the 1970s and 1980s. They won their class in the RAC rally for 17 years running. In spite of its dated image and becoming the subject of negative jokes – What do you call a Škoda with a sunroof? A skip! – Škodas remained a common sight on the roads of the United Kingdom and Western Europe throughout the 1970s and 1980s.

Sport versions of the Estelle and earlier models were produced, using the name "Rapid". Soft-top versions were also available. The Rapid was once described as the "poor man's Porsche", and had significant sales success in the UK during the 1980s.

In 1987, the Favorit was introduced, and was one of a trio of compact front-wheel drive hatchbacks from the three main Eastern Bloc manufacturers around that time, the others being VAZ's Lada Samara and Zastava's Yugo Sana. The Favorit's appearance was the work of Italian design company Bertone. With some motor technology licensed from western Europe, but still using the Škoda-designed 1289 cc engine, Škoda engineers designed a car comparable to western production. The technological gap still existed, but began closing rapidly. The Favorit was very popular in Czechoslovakia and other Eastern Bloc countries. It also sold well in Western Europe, especially in the UK and Denmark due to its low price, and was regarded as solid and reliable. However, it was perceived as having poor value compared with contemporary Western European designs. The Favorit's trim levels were improved, and it continued to be sold until the introduction of the Felicia in 1994.

Volkswagen Group subsidiary

Until 1990, Škoda was still making its outdated range of rear-engined small family cars, although it had started production of the Favorit front-wheel drive hatchback in 1987 as an eventual replacement.

The fall of communism with the Velvet Revolution brought great changes to Czechoslovakia, and most industries were subject to privatization. In the case of Škoda Automobile, the state authorities brought in a strong foreign partner. The tender for privatization was announced in 1990; 24 different companies were registered for the tender, while only eight of them expressed a serious interest – BMW, GM, Renault, Volvo, Volkswagen, Ford, Fiat, and Mercedes-Benz. In August 1990, VW and Renault were on the shortlist.

Renault first offered to terminate Favorit production and replace it with the outdated Renault 18 derivative and new Renault Twingo, which would have eliminated the Škoda brand. This offer was declined and Renault prepared a new one. They offered a 60:40 joint venture (40% share of Renault), while Škoda Favorit production was to be retained and produced side by side with the Renault 19, and producing engine units, gearboxes, and other components for Renault. Total investment would have been US$2.6 billion (US$ billion in 2019).

Volkswagen offered to continue Favorit production and preserve the Škoda brand, including retention of research and development. Volkswagen offered a purchase of 30% Škoda share, gradually increasing to 70%. Volkswagen's total investment would have been US$6.6 billion (US$ billion in 2019) by 2000. The government inclined on the Renault side, while the Škoda trade union preferred VW, because it offered significantly larger potential for development of the company.

Volkswagen was chosen by the Czech government on 9 December 1990, and as a result, on 28 March 1991 a joint-venture partnership agreement with Volkswagen took place, marked by the transfer of a 30% share to the Volkswagen Group on 16 April 1991, raised later on 19 December 1994 to 60.3% and the year after, on 11 December 1995, to 70% of its shares, with the aim of making VW the largest and controlling shareholder of Škoda. On 30 May 2000, Volkswagen AG bought the remaining 30% of the company, thus making Škoda Auto a wholly owned subsidiary of the group.

Backed by Volkswagen Group expertise and investments, the design – both style and engineering – has improved greatly. The 1994 model Felicia was effectively a reskin of the Favorit, but quality and equipment improvements helped, and in the Czech Republic, the car was perceived as good value for money and became popular. Sales improved across Europe, including the United Kingdom, where the Felicia was one of the best-ranking cars in customer satisfaction surveys.

Volkswagen AG chairman Ferdinand Piëch personally chose Dirk van Braeckel as head of design, and the subsequent Octavia and Fabia models made their way to the demanding European Union markets. They are built on common Volkswagen Group floorpans. The Fabia, launched at the end of 1999, formed the basis for later versions of the Volkswagen Polo and SEAT Ibiza, while the Octavia, launched in 1996, has shared its floorpan with a host of cars, the most popular of which is the Volkswagen Golf Mk4.

The perception of Škoda in Western Europe has completely changed since the takeover by VW, in stark comparison with the reputation of the cars throughout the 1980s described by some as "the laughing stock" of the automotive world. As technical development progressed and attractive new models were marketed, Škoda's image was initially slow to improve. In the UK, a major change was achieved with the ironic "It is a Škoda, honest" campaign, which began in 2000 when the Fabia launched. In a 2003 advertisement on British television, a new employee on the production line is fitting Škoda badges on the car bonnets. When some attractive-looking cars come along, he stands back, not fitting the badge, since they look so good they "cannot be Škodas". This market campaign worked by confronting Škoda's image problem head-on – a tactic which marketing professionals regarded as high risk. By 2005, Škoda was selling over 30,000 cars a year in the UK, a market share over 1%. For the first time in its UK history, a waiting list developed for deliveries from Škoda. UK owners have consistently ranked the brand at or near the top of customer-satisfaction surveys since the late 1990s.

In 1991, Škoda built 172,000 units, exporting 26% of its production to 30 countries, while in 2000, it built 435,000 units, exporting 82% of its production to 72 countries.

Growth strategy

One of the most important years for Škoda Auto was 2010, in terms of both products and management. On 1 September 2010, Prof. Dr. H.C. Winfried Vahland assumed responsibility for the management of the company, becoming the CEO of Škoda Auto. In the same year, Škoda set forth plans to double the company's annual sales to at least 1.5 million by 2018 (later known as the 'Growth Strategy').

At the 2010 Paris Motor Show in September 2010, the company unveiled the Octavia Green E Line. This e-car concept was the forerunner to the e-car test fleet that Škoda released in 2012. The final first-generation Octavia (Tour) was produced at the Mladá Boleslav plant in November 2010. The worldwide production of this model exceeded 1.4 million units since its release in 1996. In 2010 for the first time in history, China overtook German sales to become Škoda's largest individual market.

In 2011, Škoda Auto celebrated its 20-year partnership with the Volkswagen Group. More than 75,000 visitors attended an open-house event held in Mladá Boleslav in the April. Earlier that year, the company provided details on its 2018 Growth Strategy: for at least one new or completely revised model to be released every six months. With this in mind, the company redesigned its logo and CI, which was presented at the 2011 Geneva Motor Show. Škoda's main attraction at the event was the VisionD design concept, a forerunner to the future third-generation Octavia. Škoda presented the MissionL design study at the IAA in Frankfurt am Main in September, which was to become the basis of the company's forthcoming compact model the European Rapid.

In the same year, the company started production of the new Rapid model in Pune, India (October 2011), and launched the Škoda Citigo at Volkswagen's Bratislava plant (November 2011).

In 2012, Škoda introduced two new mass production models. The European version of the Rapid premiered at the Paris Motor Show. This car was a successor to the first-generation Octavia in terms of its price bracket. The second model was the third-generation Octavia, which premiered in December 2012. In the same month, local production of the Yeti was launched at the Nizhny Novgorod GAZ factory.

In 2012, Škoda, introduced an emission-free (on the street) fleet of Octavia Green E Line e-cars on Czech roads to be used by external partners. Since internal tests on the fleet in late 2011, the e-fleet had driven more than 250,000 km. During the same year, Škoda celebrated several milestones, including 14 million Škoda cars being produced since 1905 (January), three million Fabias (May), 500,000 Superbs at the Kvasiny plant (June), and 5 years of Škoda operations in China.

Massive rejuvenation of the model range was a major tune for 2013 at Škoda: The Czech car maker launched the third-generation Octavia Combi and Octavia RS (both liftback and estate), as well as facelifted Superb and Superb Combi. They were accompanied by brand new members of the Rapid family as the Rapid Spaceback, the first Škoda hatchback car in the compact segment, and the Chinese version of the Rapid. The Yeti also faced significant changes. With the facelift, two design variants of Škoda's compact SUV are now available, the city-likeoriented Yeti and rugged Yeti Outdoor. Chinese customers were also given a Yeti with an extended wheelbase.

In 2015, Volkswagen admitted that it had installed pollution-cheating software in many of its cars to fool regulators that its cars met emissions standards, when in fact they polluted at much higher levels than government standards. About 1.2 million Škoda cars worldwide were fitted with this emissions-cheating device. Škoda stated that Volkswagen would recall and cover refitting costs for all of the cars affected by the scandal.

In 2015, Škoda was voted the most reliable car brand in the UK. A corporate strategy was launched in 2015 to produce a range of all-electric cars from 2019.

Škoda Auto started to manufacture the large, seven-seat SUV Škoda Kodiaq in 2016, it was introduced at the Paris Motor Show in October 2016, and sales began at early 2017. In the second half of 2017,  sales began of the new compact SUV Škoda Karoq, which officially replaced the Škoda Yeti. The automaker introduced in December 2018 a new small family car, the Škoda Scala. In February 2019, the company introduced in Geneva the new subcompact crossover Škoda Kamiq.

Electrification strategy

In 2015, new Škoda chairman Bernhard Maier stated that the Volkswagen Group "is working on a modular, new electric platform and we are in the team", and  "there is no alternative to electrification." New Škoda corporate "Strategy 2025", which replaces the previous "Strategy 2018", aims to start production of a fully electric vehicle in 2020, and five electric models across different segments by 2025.

The all-electric Škoda Enyaq iV available for sale since September 2020. In 2017,Auto Shanghai, Škoda displayed its Vision E concept for an all-electric 300-bhp coupé-SUV, with level 3 autonomy capability and  range. It is based on the VW MEB platform and Škoda Auto will also manufacture electric-vehicle batteries for the Volkswagen Group in its facility in the Czech Republic. The second development stage, the Škoda Vision iV, was revealed in March 2019.

A plug-in hybrid car, the Škoda Superb iV, was available for sale from early 2020, and a small SUV model Škoda Kamiq with a natural gas-electric hybrid powertrain and a hybrid Fabia from later the same year. By March 2018, the electrification plan was expanded to 10 electrified models for 2025 - six fully electric cars and four plugin-hybrids. Out of these, five models are to be available by 2020. In 2018, the brand launched its largest-ever investment plan of €2 billion over five years into its electrification.

The brand's first fully electric car, a city car Škoda Citigo e iV, was sold from early 2020.

Sales and markets
Škoda has maintained sound financial stability over recent years. In 2013, the brand achieved sales revenues totalling €10.3 billion (2012: €10.4 billion). Due to the weak economic situation in many European countries and the expansion of the model range, operating profit reached a modest €522 million (2012: €712 million). Škoda achieved a successful start to 2014. As well as recording the highest number of deliveries to customers in a first quarter ever (247,200; up 12.1%), it recorded a significant increase in sales revenue (23.7%) to almost €3 billion. Operating profit increased 65.2% to €185 million over the previous year.

Sales figures

|-
! 1994 !! 1995 !! 1996 !! 1997 !! 1998 !! 1999 !! 2000 !! 2001 !! 2002 !! 2003 !! 2004 !! 2005 !! 2006 !! 2007 !! 2008 !! 2009 !! 2010 !! 2011 !! 2012 !! 2013 !! 2014 !! 2015 !! 2016 !! 2017 !! 2018!! 2019!! 2020!! 2021
|- style="text-align:right;"
| 172,000 || 210,000 || 261,000 || 288,458 || 261,127 || 241,256 || 148,500 || 44,963 || − || − || − || − || − || − || − || − || − || − || − || − || − || − || − || − || – || – || - || -
|- style="text-align:right;"
| − || − || − || 47,876 || 102,373 || 143,251 || 158,503 || 164,134 || 164,017 || 165,635 || 181,683 || 233,322 || 270,274 || 309,951 || 344,857 || 317,335 || 349,746 || 387,200 || 409,360 || 359,600 || 389,300 || 432,300 || 436,300 || 418,800 || 388,200 || 363,722 || 257,364 || 200,771
|- style="text-align:right;"
| − || − || − || − || − || 823 || 128,872 || 250,978 || 264,641 || 260,988 || 247,600 || 236,698 || 243,982 || 232,890 || 246,561 || 264,173 || 229,045 || 266,800 || 255,025 || 202,000 || 160,500 || 192,400 || 202,800 || 206,500 || 190,900 || 172,793 || 105,459 || 99,104
|- style="text-align:right;"
| − || − || − || − || − || − || − || 177 || 16,867 || 23,135 || 22,392 || 22,091 || 20,989 || 20,530 || 25,645 || 44,548 || 98,873 || 116,700 || 106,847 || 94,400 || 91,100 || 80,200 || 139,100 || 150,900 || 138,100 || 104,755 || 86,151 || 66,146
|- style="text-align:right;"
| − || − || − || − || − || − || − || − || − || − || − || − || 14,422 || 66,661 || 57,467 || 47,152 || 32,332 || 36,000 || 39,249 || 33,300 || 29,600 || 16,600 || − || − || – || – || - || -
|- style="text-align:right;"
| − || − || − || − || − || − || − || − || − || − || − || − || − || − || − || 11,018 || 52,604 || 70,300 || 90,952 || 82,400 || 102,900 || 99,500 || 95,600 || 69,500 || 13,100 || 10 || 2 || -
|- style="text-align:right;"
| − || − || − || − || − || − || − || − || − || − || − || − || − || − || − || − || − || 1,700 || 9,292 || 103,800 || 221,400 || 194,300 || 212,800 || 211,500 || 191,500 || 142,118 || 79,702 || 63,657
|- style="text-align:right;"
| − || − || − || − || − || − || − || − || − || − || − || − || − || − || − || − || − || 509 || 36,687 || 45,200 || 42,500 || 40,200 || 40,700 || 37,100 || 39,200 || 31,199 || 14,971 || 4,373
|- style="text-align:right;"
| − || − || − || − || − || − || − || − || − || − || − || − || − || − || − || − || − || − || − || − || − || − || − || 100,000 || 149,200 || 171,794 || 131,590 || 98,566
|- style="text-align:right;"
| − || − || − || − || − || − || − || − || − || − || − || − || − || − || − || − || − || − || − || − || − || − || − || 6,300 || 115,700 || 152,708 || 137,223 || 119,156
|- style="text-align:right;"
| − || − || − || − || − || − || − || − || − || − || − || − || − || − || − || − || − || − || − || − || − || − || − || – || 27,900 || 64,597 || 128,539 || 120,742
|- style="text-align:right;"
| − || − || − || − || − || − || − || − || − || − || − || − || − || − || − || − || − || − || − || − || − || − || − || − || − || 39,071 || 63,181 || 48,154
|- style="text-align:right;"
| − || − || − || − || − || − || − || − || − || − || − || − || − || − || − || − || − || − || − || − || − || − || − || − || − || − || 634 || 44,718
|- style="text-align:right;"
| − || − || − || − || − || − || − || − || − || − || − || − || − || − || − || − || − || − || − || − || − || − || − || − || − || − || − || 12,815
|- style="text-align:right;"
! 172,000 || 210,000 || 261,000 || 336,334 || 363,500 || 385,330 || 435,403 || 460,252 || 445,525 || 449,758 || 451,675 || 492,111 || 549,667 || 630,032 || 674,530 || 684,226 || 762,600 || 879,200 || 949,412 || 920,800 || 1,037,200 || 1,055,500 || 1,127,700 || 1,200,500 || 1,253,700 || 1,242,816 || 1,004,816 || 878,202

Markets

As of August 2016, Škoda was being sold in 102 countries. In 2020, the top markets for Škoda by number of sales were China (173,300), Germany (161,775), Russia (94,632), Czech Republic (83,249), Great Britain (58,431) and Poland (56,152). In the Asia-Pacific region, Škoda is also being sold in Australia, New Zealand, Taiwan, Brunei and India. Škoda is also planning to expand into Iran, where imports are to be started from 2018 and production of vehicles by 2020. Expansion strategy also includes Singapore.

Production
Škoda cars are now made in factories in the Czech Republic, China, India and Slovakia. A smaller number of Škoda models are additionally manufactured in Solomonovo, Ukraine through local partner. Till 2020 also there was manufacturing in Öskemen, Kazakhstan. The following table lists the factories and their production models in 2019.

Motorsport

The Škoda brand has been engaged in motor sport since 1901, and has gained a number of titles with various vehicles around the world. The team had competed as a manufacturer in the Intercontinental Rally Challenge (before it merged with ERC in 2013) and World Rally Championship between 1999 and 2005. Now it competes in the European Rally Championship and WRC-2.

Until the final season of IRC in 2012, Škoda Motorsport was the most successful manufacturer with a total of 27 points, winning the rallying series in 2010–2012. Since 2013, When the two competing series were merged, it continued to compete in the European Rally Championship.

Škoda Motorsport drivers won with the Škoda Fabia S2000 the European Rally Championships in 2012–2014.

World Rally Championship

Following a long history of class victories in lower levels of motorsport, Škoda became a participant in the FIA World Rally Championship in the 1999 season, with World Rally Car models of the Škoda Octavia. Škoda's best result with the Octavia WRC was Armin Schwarz's third place at the 2001 Safari Rally. From mid 2003, the Octavia was replaced by the smaller Škoda Fabia. Škoda used the 2004 season to develop the car further, but did not achieve much success the following season. However, at the season-ending Rally Australia, 1995 world champion Colin McRae was running second before retiring. Škoda then withdrew from the series, and the 2006 season saw Škoda represented by the semi-privateer Red Bull Škoda Team. Jan Kopecký drove the Fabia WRC to fifth place at the Rally Catalunya, and as late as the 2007 Rallye Deutschland the Fabia still achieved a fifth-place result, again in the hands of Kopecký. Former works Ford and Citroen driver François Duval also drove a Fabia WRC in 2006 for the privateer First Motorsport team, achieving a sixth-place finish in Catalunya.

World Rally Championship-2

In 2009, Škoda entered the Intercontinental Rally Challenge (IRC) for the first time, using the Fabia S2000, winning three rallies and finishing second in both the drivers and manufacturers championship. In 2010, Škoda won a total of seven IRC events winning both the manufacturers and driver championship for Juho Hänninen. These achievements were repeated in the following two seasons, with Andreas Mikkelsen as the drivers' champion. In 2013, the Intercontinental Rally Challenge was merged with the European Rally Championship (ERC) and the team gained the drivers' championship title once again for Jan Kopecký. The car was also raced by privateers in several championships, including Red Bull, Barwa, Rene Georges and Rufa in the 2010 Super 2000 World Rally Championship.

Škoda Motorsport won the 2015, 2016, 2017 and 2018 WRC-2 championships with Škoda Fabia R5.

Bonneville Speedway
In August 2011, a special Škoda Octavia vRS set a world record at the Bonneville Speedway and became the fastest production car in the world with an engine up to two litres, when it hit .

Current models

 Škoda Enyaq – all-electric crossover SUV (since 2020)
 Škoda Kodiaq – SUV (since 2016)
 Škoda Karoq – compact SUV (since 2017)
 Škoda Kamiq – crossover SUV (since 2019)
 Škoda Kushaq – crossover SUV (since 2021)
 Škoda Superb III – Compact executive car (since 2015)
 Škoda Octavia IV – Small family car (since 2019)
 Škoda Slavia – Subcompact car (since 2022)
 Škoda Rapid – Small family car (since 2012)
 Škoda Scala – Small family car (since 2019)
 Škoda Fabia IV – Supermini (since 2021)

Logo
In 1923, two different trademarks were registered at the Office for Innovation and Model Registration in Plzeň. The first depicted a winged arrow pointing to the right with five feathers in a circle and the second was a winged arrow with three feathers. The famous winged arrow with three feathers still forms the Škoda logo today. The ŠKODA text was added to the logo in 1936. The arrow represents speed, the wings progress and freedom, the eye precision and the circle unity, completeness, world and harmony. The story goes that, on his travels through the US, Emil Škoda had once been so taken with a Native American's feathered headdress that he had returned to Plzeň with a relief image which inspired the logo.

See also

 Avia
 List of Czech automobiles
 Škoda Auto Volkswagen India
 Škoda Works
 Tatra

Explanatory notes

Citations

General and cited references 
 
Jetschgo, Johannes (2019). Škoda: A Car That Made History. Prague: Vitalis.

External links

 
 
 Skoda-storyboard – official news of Škoda Auto
 Carsaddon – news of Škoda Auto
 Skoda – Škoda Auto cars and news in Egypt

 
1895 establishments in Austria-Hungary
Mladá Boleslav
Czech brands
Car manufacturers of the Czech Republic
Cars of the Czech Republic
Motor vehicle manufacturers of Czechoslovakia
Vehicle manufacturing companies established in 1895
Volkswagen Group